In English, ding ding is an onomatopoeia word referring to the sound of a ringing bell

Ding ding may also refer to:

People
 Sa Dingding (born 1983), Chinese folk singer
 Ding Ding (tennis) (born 1977), female Chinese tennis player
 Ding Ding (Audiovisual) (Resident of Port Toilet), Global Vidiot

Music
 "Ring A Ding-Ding" (Leslie and the LY's song), a song by American group Leslie and the LY's from the 2004 album Gold Pants
 Ring-a-Ding-Ding!, 1961 album by Frank Sinatra
 "Ring-dinge-ding", 1967 Netherlands entry in the Eurovision Song Contest
 "Ring-a-Ding-Ding!", 2005 single by Brakes
 "Ring Ding Ding", 2006 single by Pondlife (see Crazy Frog)

Other
 Ding Ding Tong, traditional Hong Kong confectionery
 Ding-ding, and away, a type of railway accident
 Hong Kong Tramways, which is nicknamed "Ding Ding" because of the sound of its bell
 A character from the Hong Kong television series Forensic Heroes II

See also
 Ding Dang (disambiguation)
 Ding Dong (disambiguation)
 "My Ding-a-Ling", novelty song